The Balkan Super League is a rugby league football competition for clubs in the Balkans region of Europe. The competition operates in addition to the national leagues of the respective nations as a Champions League-style competition, with some clubs holding licences to compete annually, like the EuroLeague. As of 2022 clubs from Serbia, Greece, Turkey, Albania, Bulgaria, Bosnia and Herzegovina, Italy and Montenegro have competed.

History
The Balkan Super League first round started 11 April 2017. Partizan defeated Red Star 32–26 in the inaugural Balkan Super League Grand Final.

The competition will expand to 15 teams in 2018, with the addition of Greek, Montenegro and Albanian clubs. In the second Grand Final Red Star defeated Partizan.
The 2019 season saw the competition split into two divisions. The 2020 season was planned to be a knock-out system with 11 clubs competing from 5 countries: Bosnia and Herzegovina, Bulgaria, Serbia, Montenegro and Turkey, but was cancelled due to the COVID-19 Pandemic. 

The 2022 format featured an incomplete round robin followed by a Grand Final.

Teams

Current clubs
Below are the teams for the 2023 season.

Division 1 

Source:

Division 2

Former clubs
 Borac Banja Luka RLFC
 Warriors Drvar RLFC
 FIS Vitez Knights RLFC
 Valacite Pernik RLFC
 Aris Eagles RLFC
 Patras RLFC
 Rhodes Knights RLFC
 Lignano Sharks RLFC
 South Region RLFC
 Belgrade Youth RLFC
 Dorcol Belgrade RLFC
 Radnicki New Belgrade RLFC
 Red Kangaroo Belgrade RLFC
 Tzar Dusan Mighty RLFC
 Ankara Phrygians RLFC
 Bilgi Badgers RLFC
 Boshporus Wolves RLFC
 Kladikoy Bulls RLFC
Source:

Champions

References

External links
Balkan Super League Facebook
Balkan Super League – Serbia Rugby League
Official Site

European rugby league competitions
Sports leagues established in 2017
Rugby league in Bosnia and Herzegovina
Rugby league in Bulgaria
Rugby league in Serbia
Rugby league in Turkey